Experiments and Observations on Electricity is a treatise by Benjamin Franklin based on letters that he wrote to Peter Collinson, who communicated Franklin's ideas to the Royal Society. The letters were published as a book in England in 1751, and over the following years the book was reissued in four more editions containing additional material, the last in 1774. Science historian I. Bernard Cohen crafted an edition with historical commentary that was published in 1941.

References

Further reading
 Original source:

External links
 Experiments and observations on electricity, made at Philadelphia in America (1751), scanned from a copy in Franklin's personal library with his own handwritten notes, at the Internet Archive

Book series introduced in 1751
1751 books
1754 books
1760 books
1769 books
1774 non-fiction books
American non-fiction books
Works by Benjamin Franklin
Letters (message)
Physics books
Science books
Electricity
Experiments
Pamphlets